Rocher may refer to:

Places

Canada
Rocher Lake (Nipukatasi River), in the Broadback River watershed in Quebec
Petit-Rocher, a village in Gloucester County, New Brunswick
Rocher Percé, a natural arch near the village of Percé, Quebec

France 
Rocher, Ardèche, a commune in the department of the Ardèche
Rochers de Naye, a summit of Alps
Notre-Dame-du-Rocher, a commune in the department of Orne
Saint-Antoine-du-Rocher, a commune in the department of Indre-et-Loire

Elsewhere
Rocher de Monaco or Rock of Monaco, a monolith

Other uses
Allan Rocher (1936–2016), Australian politician
Captain Rocher, a character in Dan Brown's book, Angels & Demons
Ferrero Rocher, chocolate balls
Yves Rocher (1930–2009), French businessman and cosmetician